Persea is a genus of 99 accepted number species of evergreen trees belonging to the laurel family, Lauraceae. The best-known member of the genus is the avocado, P. americana, widely cultivated in subtropical regions for its large, edible fruit. There are more than 200 synonyms in the genus.

The following list is according to The Plant List.

Accepted species

Persea alba  Nees & Mart.	    
Persea albida  Kosterm.	   
Persea americana  Mill.	    
Persea areolatocostae  (C.K.Allen) van der Werff	     
Persea benthamiana  Meisn.	    
Persea bernardii  L.E.Kopp	     
Persea boldufolia  Mez	 
Persea bootanica  (Meisn.) Kosterm.	    
Persea borbonia  (L.) Spreng.  
Persea brenesii  Standl.	    
Persea brevipes  Meisn.	     
Persea brevipetiolata  van der Werff	   
Persea bullata  L.E. Kopp	    
Persea caerulea  (Ruiz & Pav.) Mez	    
Persea campii  L.E. Kopp	    
Persea carolinensis  (Raf.) Nees	     
Persea chamissonis  Mez	   
Persea chayuensis  (S.K. Lee) Kosterm.	   
Persea chrysantha  Lorea-Hern.	  
Persea chunii  (H.T. Chang ex S.C. Lee) Kosterm.	   
Persea cinerascens  Blake	     
Persea conferta  L.E. Kopp	  
Persea corymbosa  Mez	   
Persea croatii  van der Werff   
Persea croizatii  van der Werff	   
Persea cuneata  Meisn.	    
Persea curranii  (Merr.) Kosterm.	  
Persea declinata  (Blume) Kosterm.	    
Persea donnell-smithii  Mez	    
Persea effusa  (Meisn.) Hemsl.	   
Persea excelsa  (Blume) Kosterm.	  
Persea fastigiata  L.E.Kopp	     
Persea fendleri  van der Werff	   
Persea fluviatilis  van der Werff	   
Persea fragrans  (Kaneh. ex S.C. Lee) Kosterm.   
Persea fruticosa  (Kurz) Kosterm.	   
Persea fuliginosa  Nees & Mart.	  
Persea fulva  L.E.Kopp	     
Persea grandiflora  L.E.Kopp	   
Persea grandis  Mez	   
Persea haenkeana  Mez	  
Persea hartwegii  (Meisn.) Hemsl.  
Persea hemsleyi  (Nakai) Kosterm.	     
Persea hexanthera  L.E. Kopp	   
Persea hintonii  C.K. Allen  
Persea hirta  Nees	     
Persea humilis  Nash	  
Persea indica  (L.) Spreng.	    
Persea jenmanii  Mez	   
Persea levinei  (Merr.) Kosterm.  
Persea liebmannii  Mez	   
Persea lingue  (Miers ex Bertero) Nees	   
Persea longipes  (Schltdl.) Meisn.  
Persea macrantha  (Nees) Kosterm.   
Persea maguirei  L.E.Kopp	     
Persea major  (Meisn.) L.E.Kopp	  )  
Persea melanophylla  (H.W. Li) Kosterm.	   
Persea meridensis  L.E.Kopp	   
Persea mutisii  Kunth	   
Persea nudigemma  van der Werff	 
Persea obovata  Nees & Mart.	   
Persea obscura  Lorea-Hern.  
Persea obtusifolia  L.E. Kopp	   
Persea odoratissima  (Nees) Kosterm.	  
Persea pajonalis  van der Werff	    
Persea pallescens  (Mez) Lorea-Hern. 
Persea pallida  (Nees) Oliv.	   
Persea palustris  (Raf.) Sarg.	   
Persea peduncularis  (Nees) Nees	  
Persea pedunculata  (Blume) Kosterm.  
Persea pedunculosa  Meisn.	  
Persea perseiphylla  (C.K.Allen) van der Werff	  
Persea peruviana  Nees	  
Persea petiolaris  (Meisn.) Deb	   
Persea pierrei  (Lecomte) Kosterm.	   
Persea pseudofasciculata  L.E.Kopp	   
Persea purpusii  L.E. Kopp	   
Persea pyrifolia  Nees	   
Persea raimondii  O. Schmidt  
Persea rigens  C.K.Allen	  
Persea rigida  Nees & Mart.	    
Persea rufescens  Lundell	   
Persea ruizii  J.F.Macbr.	    
Persea schiedeana  Nees	  
Persea sericea  Kunth  
Persea shiwandashanica  (Hung T. Chang) Kosterm.	  
Persea sphaerocarpa  (H.J.P.Winkl.) Kosterm.	  
Persea standleyi  C.K.Allen	  
Persea stricta  Mez	  
Persea subcordata  (Ruiz & Pav.) Nees	   
Persea tomentosa  (D. Don) Spreng.	
Persea triplinervis  (Griseb.) M. Gómez	    
Persea trollii  O.C. Schmidt	 
Persea venosa  Nees & Mart.	 
Persea veraguasensis  Seem.	 
Persea vesticula  Standl. & Steyerm.	 
Persea wangchiana  (Chun) Kosterm.	  
Persea weberbaueri  Mez	   
Persea willdenovii Kosterm.

References

External links

Avocado source Extensive information on the Avocado — and the genus Persea and subgenera.
Flora of North America: Persea
Flora of China: Machilus — full list of Machilus species native to China.

List
Persea